Anatoli is a town in the Ioannina regional unit, Greece.

Anatoli may also refer to:

 Anatoli, Lasithi, Greece
 Anatoli (given name), a Russian masculine given name
 Anatoli (newspaper), a newspaper in the Ottoman Empire published in Karamanli Turkish

See also
 Anatol
 Anatole (disambiguation)
 Anatolia (disambiguation)
 Anatolio